Albert James Walmsley was a judge and politician from Northern Ireland.  He was an Ulster Unionist Party member of the Senate of Northern Ireland between 1957 and 1964.

He was portrayed in the BBC Northern Ireland documentary/drama, Scapegoat, about the murder of Sir Lancelot Curran's daughter.  Walmsley was the solicitor for the defendant, Iain Hay Gordon.

Publications
 Walmsley, A. J. (1959), Northern Ireland: its Policies and Record, Belfast: Ulster Unionist Council

References

Members of the Senate of Northern Ireland 1957–1961
Members of the Senate of Northern Ireland 1961–1965
Judges in Northern Ireland
Year of birth missing
Possibly living people
People from County Antrim
Ulster Unionist Party members of the Senate of Northern Ireland